Chess equipment are the tangible items required to play a game of chess. A chess player  playing a game of online chess, correspondence chess, computer chess or non-tournament chess may choose their own preferred configuration of chess equipment. Receiving assistance from A.I. based software is prohibited in the majority of chess tournaments, regardless if they played over-the-board or with long-distance methods such as online chess or correspondence chess

Fédération Internationale des Échecs (FIDE) or the World Chess Federation, the game's international governing body, states that in tournaments that it runs, that If necessary FIDE will determine the general conditions for other equipment needed in chess competitions, such as score sheets, demonstration boards, etc.[1]

FIDE recommends that chess equipment used in top level competitions is approved by participating players. In the case of a disagreement by either player, the equipment to be used should be decided by the Chief Organiser or the Chief Arbiter of the event. FIDE highly recommends that all chess equipment used in a competition is standardized for all players and games.

See also

 Chess box, container for holding chess pieces
 Chess set, chess pieces and a chessboard

References